Drillmatic – Heart vs. Mind (or simply Drillmatic) is the eleventh studio album by American rapper the Game, released on August 12, 2022, by 100 Entertainment and Virgin Music Services. The album was initially scheduled for release on July 8, 2022, but was delayed. The album includes the January 2022 single "Eazy" with Kanye West, the single "Stupid" with Big Sean, in addition to collaborations with Drake, Ice-T, Fivio Foreign, Roddy Ricch, YG, Ty Dolla Sign, Moneybagg Yo, ASAP Rocky, Jeremih, Pusha T, Lil Wayne, 2 Chainz, Meek Mill, Dreezy, G Herbo, Blxst, French Montana, Tory Lanez, Rick Ross, Nipsey Hussle, Chris Brown, Blueface, Twista, Cam'ron, Chlöe, Cassie, and DJ Khaled across its other 30 tracks.

The album includes the song "The Black Slim Shady", which is a 10-minute diss track aimed at rapper Eminem, and also includes the song "World Tours" featuring Nipsey Hussle, although it remains unplayable on streaming services.

Background
The Game said on his social media profiles that Drillmatic would make listeners "understand" why he is "the best rapper alive", also writing that "This album has a strong hold on being the best album of my career". He had earlier said that part of the reason for the delay, along with sample clearances, was "disloyalty on levels unimaginable by people I've trusted with my heart, money, career & livelihood".

Track listing

Notes
"Drake with the Braids" (interlude) features vocals by Drake.
"O.P.P." originally featured YoungBoy Never Broke Again; however, his verse was removed from the album a week after its release due to YoungBoy's clearance issues.
"World Tours" was removed from the album after its release.
Initial track listing featured "Wasteman", but it was not released.

Sample credits
"La La Land" contains a sample of "Friday" by Ice Cube.
"No Man Falls" contains a sample of "Blow Away Breeze" by Marvin Sims.
"Chrome Slugs & Harmony" contains a sample of "Thuggish Ruggish Bone" by Bone Thugs-n-Harmony.
"Start from Scratch II" contains a sample of "Get Away" by Mobb Deep.

Charts

References

2022 albums
The Game (rapper) albums
MNRK Music Group albums

Albums produced by Hit-Boy
Albums produced by DJ Mustard
Albums produced by DJ Paul
Albums produced by London on da Track
Albums produced by Symbolyc One
Albums produced by DJ Premier
Albums produced by Mike Dean (record producer)
Albums produced by Swizz Beatz